Dave Pottinger is a video game programmer and designer. He formerly worked at Ensemble Studios, where he worked on game engines and AI. He now heads BonusXP, an independent video game studio which has produced two mobile games, and has an RTS game called Servo in Early Access on the Steam platform.

He is a graduate of University of Arizona with a computer engineering degree and has a wife, Kristen.

Works
 1996, Avarice (Stardock/Continuous Software Systems) 
 1997, Age of Empires
 1998, Age of Empires: The Rise of Rome
 1999, Age of Empires II: The Age of Kings
 2000, Age of Empires II: The Conquerors
 2002, Age of Mythology
 2003, Age of Mythology: The Titans
 2005, Age of Empires III
 2006, Age of Empires III: The WarChiefs
 2009, Halo Wars
 2012, Monster Crew
 2015, Servo
 2019, Stranger Things 3: The Game
 2020, The Dark Crystal: Age of Resistance Tactics

References

External links
 Dave Pottinger's interview about Age of Empires for GamesWeb
 Official website for Gee Logic Software Co., Ltd
 Another interview at Age of Empires Heaven fansite
 Interviews set at Ensemble Studios' website ("Age of Empires: Where it all Began Interviews", with 5 different developers.)
 BonusXP "about" page featuring Pottinger

Year of birth missing (living people)
Living people
University of Arizona alumni
American video game designers
Ensemble Studios people